Williamsburg Township is a township in Franklin County, Kansas, USA.  As of the 2000 census, its population was 672.  It was named for the small town of Williamsburg.

Geography
According to the USGS, it contains one cemetery, Mount Hope.

The stream of Mill Creek runs through this township.

Adjacent Townships
Greenwood Township, Franklin County (north)
Homewood Township, Franklin County (northeast)
Ohio Township, Franklin County (east)
Richmond Township, Franklin County (east)
Putnam Township, Anderson County (southeast)
Reeder Township, Anderson County (south)
Rock Creek Township, Coffey County (southwest)
Lincoln Township, Osage County (west)

Towns and Settlements
Ransomville
Silkville
Williamsburg

Points of interest

Silkville.  Founded by Ernest de Boissiere in 1870, Silkville was based entirely on the silk industry.  The small community thrived until 1892 when de Boissiere donated the ranch to the Independent Order of Odd Fellows and returned to France.

References
 USGS Geographic Names Information System (GNIS)

External links
 US-Counties.com
 City-Data.com

Townships in Franklin County, Kansas
Townships in Kansas